Martin Jessop Price (27 March 1939 – 28 April 1995) was a British numismatist who was made a Merit Deputy Keeper of the British Museum in 1978, a corresponding member of the German Archaeological Institute and was a visiting fellow at the Institute for Advanced Study in Princeton, New Jersey, 1986-87. In 1992 he was awarded the medal of the Royal Numismatic Society. He was educated at King's School, Canterbury and Queens' College, Cambridge, where he graduated with a firsts in classics. In 1961, he won a Greek government scholarship which introduced him to the British School of Athens. In 1966, he was appointed Assistant Keeper in the Department of Coins and Medals at the British Museum, under Kenneth Jenkins, and was eventually appointed Deputy Keeper in 1978 which is a position he held until September 1994 when he became Director at the British School of Athens until his death.

Personal life 
Martin had a lifelong connection with Greece and was fluent in modern Greek. He would eventually meet his wife in 1965 and have two sons and a daughter. He was described as an inspiration to his colleagues who would often throw himself into projects that had little reward but were necessary.

Notable Work 

 Coins of the Macedonians
 The Seven Wonders of The Ancient World
 Coinage in the Greek World
 Coins and their cities: Architecture on the ancient coins of Greece, Rome, and Palestine
 The coinage in the name of Alexander the Great and Philip Arrhidaeus: a British Museum catalogue

References 

1939 births
1995 deaths
British numismatists
Directors of the British School at Athens
Employees of the British Museum